Everything in Slow Motion (EISM) is an American music project by former Hands frontman Shane Ochsner from Fargo, North Dakota. The project began in February 2012, and he signed with Facedown Records soon thereafter. EISM first released a studio EP entitled Red in late 2012, and his first studio album entitled Phoenix that released in late 2013. The latter got the project commercial successes and critical acclaim.

Background
After the hiatus of Hands, Shane Ochsner started the solo project on his own in February 2012. He signed with Facedown Records sometime in 2012 before he released his first studio EP.

History
On October 2, 2012, EISM released his first studio EP entitled Red on Facedown Records, but did not see any critical or commercial viability from the work. After that, EISM went back into the studio to craft his first studio album called Phoenix that was met with commercial charting successes, and it got critical acclaim.

Additional Musicians
Session
 Miles McPherson - Drums (2016) (ex-Paramore, ex-Maylene and the Sons of Disaster)

Live
 Aaron Bickel (2016–present)
 Mychael Scott Reed (2016–present)
 Aaron Crawford - Drums (2016–present) (NOW NOW Sleepyhead)

Discography
Studio EPs

Studio albums

As guest artist
 In the Midst of Lions - "Reborn" (The Heart of Man, 2010)
 Your Memorial - "Endeavor for Purpose" and "Atonement" (Atonement, 2010)
 A Hope For Home - "Tides" (In Abstraction, 2011) 
 Abandon Kansas - "Mirror" (Alligator, 2015) 
 Hope for the Dying - "Wretched Curse" (Legacy, 2016)
 My Epic - "Ghost Story" (Viscera EP, 2016)

References

External links
 

Living people
American performers of Christian music
Facedown Records artists
Musicians from North Dakota
People from North Dakota
Songwriters from North Dakota
Year of birth missing (living people)